Dihydropicrotoxinin is the saturated derivative of picrotoxinin. Its radiolabeled derivative, [3H]dihydropicrotoxinin, is used in scientific research to study the GABA receptors.

See also
Picrotoxin

References

Convulsants
GABAA receptor negative allosteric modulators
Tertiary alcohols
Isopropyl compounds
Lactones
Epoxides
Oxygen heterocycles